= J. Nicholls =

English footballer

Personal information
- Date of birth: 1867
- Place of birth: West Bromwich, England
- Position: Half back

Senior career*
| Years | Team | Apps | (Gls) |
| 1889–1890 | West Bromwich Albion | 4 | (0) |
- * Club domestic league appearances and goals

J. Nicholls (born 1867) was an English footballer who played in the Football League for West Bromwich Albion.
